Reginaldo Ferreira da Silva (born 31 July 1983) is a Brazilian professional footballer who plays as a second striker for  club Picerno.

Club career

Treviso
Born in Jundiaí, Brazil, Reginaldo started his career with Brazilian club Campo Grande. The club was associated with football agency Pedrinho VRP, which helped numbers of Brazilian footballers transferred to Italy. Reginaldo began his professional career with Treviso in 2001, and helped the club win promotion from the third-tier Serie C1 league to the top-flight Serie A championship (also due to the relegation of Genoa, as well as the expel of Torino and Perugia due to their financial difficulties). On 27 August 2005, Serie A club Udinese signed him outright (cash plus 50% registration rights of Dino Fava) from Treviso, but loaning Reginaldo back to the Veneto club immediately.

Fiorentina

Followed by the relegation at the end of 2005–06 Serie A season, Reginaldo moved to Serie A club ACF Fiorentina from Udinese for €1 million. He played 27 games and scored six goals for Fiorentina during the 2006–07 Serie A season, after which he moved to league rivals Parma F.C., signing a 5-year contract.

Parma
Reginaldo was signed by Parma for €4.5 million fee. He was one of the forward of the team along with Igor Budan, Cristiano Lucarelli and Bernardo Corradi. Reginaldo started most of the game, and Corradi was the second. That season Parma used 4–3–3 or 4–5–1 formation, and Budan was the topscorer of 7 goals. Among the 4 goals were played along with Reginaldo.

Parma were relegated at the end of the 2007–08 Serie A season, but Reginaldo stayed with the club for the 2008–09 Serie B season. Having helped Parma win promotion for the 2009–10 Serie A, he moved to Serie A rivals A.C. Siena, signing a contract on 27 June 2009 in a co-ownership deal.

Siena
In June 2009 Siena signed Reginaldo from Parma in a co-ownership deal for €2.5 million fee as well as Francesco Parravicini in a definitive deal for €2.5 million fee, as part of a cashless swap that Daniele Galloppa moved to Parma also in a co-ownership deal for €5 million fee. Reginaldo followed the team relegated to 2010–11 Serie B.

Under Antonio Conte, Reginaldo scored 7 goals and won promotion back to Serie A. The co-ownership also terminated in June 2011 as part of Galloppa and Gonçalo Brandão's deal. Parma got the full card of Galloppa for pre-agreed €5 million fee, while Siena got Reginaldo for pre-agreed €2.5M fee as well as Ângelo for €2.5 million fee.

JEF United Chiba
In March 2012, Siena announced that Reginaldo would play on loan to Japanese club JEF United Chiba. The loan agreement was supposed to run until December 2012 but, after 10 games and no goals, he returned on June to Siena.

Vasco da Gama
Reginaldo returned to Brazil in June 2013 on a free transfer. After poor appearances he was released.

Return to Italy
Circa mid-2016 Reginaldo returned to Italy for Serie C club Paganese. He was about to join Serie D club Sambenedettese in January 2016. However, he was blocked by a non-EU players rule of Italian Football Federation, that amateur club can only sign two non-EU players, given an application was submitted on 31 December 2015. He obtained a resident status in Italy in February 2016, making him eligible for a European Union passport.

On 31 July 2017, Reginaldo was signed by another Serie C club Trapani on a one-year contract. In January 2018 he joined Serie B club Pro Vercelli.

In July 2018, Reginaldo joined Serie C club Monza.

On 17 July 2019, he joined Reggina.

On 17 September 2020 he signed a 2-year contract with Catania.

In September 2021, Reginaldo signed with Picerno.

Footnotes

References

External links
 La Gazzetta dello Sport profile (2006–07) 
La Samb su Reginaldo, lo conferma Fedeli Il brasiliano a gennaio sarà al Riviera‚ sport.corriereadriatico.it, 30 December 2015

 AIC profile (data by football.it) 

1983 births
Living people
Brazilian footballers
Brazilian expatriate footballers
Serie A players
Serie B players
Serie C players
Campeonato Brasileiro Série A players
Campeonato Brasileiro Série B players
J2 League players
Campo Grande Atlético Clube players
Treviso F.B.C. 1993 players
ACF Fiorentina players
Parma Calcio 1913 players
A.C.N. Siena 1904 players
JEF United Chiba players
CR Vasco da Gama players
Trapani Calcio players
F.C. Pro Vercelli 1892 players
A.C. Monza players
Reggina 1914 players
Catania S.S.D. players
AZ Picerno players
Expatriate footballers in Italy
Expatriate footballers in Japan
Brazilian expatriate sportspeople in Italy
Association football forwards
Footballers from São Paulo (state)